The Palmerston Forts (19th-century fortifications built to defend Britain from a perceived French threat) in the Isle of Portland area, Dorset, England, are:

East Weare Battery
Inner Pierhead Fort
The Nothe Fort
Portland Breakwater Fort
The Verne Citadel (later including Verne High Angle Battery)

Isle of Portland
Isle of Portland